A Life in the Theatre is a 1993 American made-for-television comedy-drama film starring Matthew Broderick and Jack Lemmon.  It is based on David Mamet's 1977 play of the same name. Lemmon was nominated for a Golden Globe Award for his portrayal of Robert.

This is the second adaptation of Mamet's play following the 1979 version.

Plot

Cast
Matthew Broderick as John
Jack Lemmon as Robert

References

External links
 
 

1993 television films
1993 comedy-drama films
1993 films
1990s English-language films
American comedy-drama television films
Beacon Pictures films
TNT Network original films
Films based on works by David Mamet
Films scored by David Michael Frank
Films with screenplays by David Mamet
1990s American films